Podlesnoye is a rural locality (a village) in Donskoy Selsoviet, Belebeyevsky District, Bashkortostan, Russia. The population was 138 as of 2010. There are 3 streets.

Geography 
Podlesnoye is located 7 km east of Belebey (the district's administrative centre) by road. Belebey is the nearest rural locality.

References 

Rural localities in Belebeyevsky District